Yankee Madness is a 1924 American silent drama film directed by Charles R. Seeling and starring George Larkin, Billie Dove, and Walter Long.

Plot
As described in a film magazine review, Richard Morton rescues Dolores, a young Spanish woman, from bandits who attack her in New Orleans. Learning that she has gone to Sevilla, Central America, he follows. A revolution is in progress. Richard heads the forces of President Dominguez and defeats the rebels. He saves Dominguez and Dolores from their enemy, Rodolfo Emanon. It transpires that she is the President's daughter. Richard   wins her affections and she becomes his wife.

Cast

References

Bibliography
 Munden, Kenneth White. The American Film Institute Catalog of Motion Pictures Produced in the United States, Part 1. University of California Press, 1997.

External links
 

1924 films
1924 drama films
1920s English-language films
American silent feature films
Silent American drama films
American black-and-white films
Film Booking Offices of America films
Films directed by Charles R. Seeling
Films with screenplays by George H. Plympton
1920s American films